Collective Invention is a South Korean black comedy film written and directed by Kwon Oh-kwang. It is about a hapless fish-man's meteoric rise to celebrity and subsequent fall from grace. The film was screened in the Vanguard section of the 2015 Toronto International Film Festival.

Plot
A medical experiment gone wrong and a man mutates due to side effects from an experimental drug administered to him, turning him into a fish-man. When his supposedly girlfriend posts the story of her 'fishy' boyfriend on the internet, a wannabe reporter starts digging for the truth, covering the news about the mutant fish-man.

Cast
 Lee Kwang-soo as Park Gu
 Lee Chun-hee as Sang-won
 Park Bo-young as Ju-jin
 Jang Gwang as Gu's father
 Lee Byung-joon as Dr. Byun
 Kim Hee-won as Lawyer Kim
 Jung In-gi as Dong-sik
 Choi Ji-ho as Chairman's assistant

Reception

Awards and nominations

References

External links

2015 films
2015 black comedy films
2010s science fiction comedy films
South Korean black comedy films
South Korean science fiction comedy films
2010s Korean-language films
2015 directorial debut films
2010s South Korean films